Carole Hélène Lewis (born 26 October 1953 in Johannesburg) is a retired judge of the Supreme Court of Appeal of South Africa.

Biography 
Lewis studied law at the University of the Witwatersrand and graduated with a BA in 1973, an LL.B. (cum laude) in 1975 and an LL.M. (cum laude) in 1985. In 1978, she was admitted as an attorney and also joined the Wits School of Law.

In 1988, Lewis was appointed professor of law at Wits and five years later, in 1993, she became the dean of the Faculty of Law. She was appointed as a judge of the Transvaal Provincial Division from 1 November 1999 and was promoted to Judge of Supreme Court of Appeal in 2003. She retired in 2019.

References

South African women judges
1953 births
Living people
South African judges